Joe Stanley (born 1957) is a New Zealand rugby player.

Joe Stanley may also refer to:
Joe Stanley (1880s outfielder), American football player, outfielder for the 1884 Baltimore Monumentals
Joe Stanley (1900s outfielder) (1881–1967), American football player for the Washington Senators, Boston Beaneaters and Chicago Cubs
Joe Stanley (colonel) (1908–2012), American pilot, colonel
Joseph Stanley Brown (1858–1941), secretary to James Garfield, also married Garfield's daughter